Adinfer is a commune in the Pas-de-Calais department in northern France.

Geography
A farming village located 6 miles (9 km) south of Arras, at the D4, D7 and D35 road junction.

Population

Sights
 The church of St.Nicholas, dating from the twentieth century, built after the village was destroyed in World War I.

See also
 Communes of the Pas-de-Calais department

References

External links

 Official website of the commune 

Communes of Pas-de-Calais